South Twin Island is an uninhabited Arctic island located east of Akimiski Island toward the center of James Bay. The larger, similarly shaped, North Twin Island is located approximately 10 km northwest. South Twin Island has more mossy tundra and fewer trees than North Twin Island. The two islands are referred to as the Twin Islands, and are part of the Qikiqtaaluk Region of the Canadian territory of Nunavut.

South Twin Island is an important breeding site for Canada geese and semipalmated plovers.

References

 Map Planet

Islands of James Bay
Uninhabited islands of Qikiqtaaluk Region